Charles T. Mason House, also known as Mason Croft, is a historic home located at Sumter, Sumter County, South Carolina. It was built about 1904, and is a two-story, brick Neo-Classical style dwelling. It features a full height portico supported by six fluted columns with Corinthian order capitals.  Also on the property are a contributing playhouse and garage.

It was added to the National Register of Historic Places in 1997.

References

Houses on the National Register of Historic Places in South Carolina
Neoclassical architecture in South Carolina
Houses completed in 1904
Houses in Sumter County, South Carolina
National Register of Historic Places in Sumter County, South Carolina